The occipital sinus is the smallest of the dural venous sinuses. It is usually unpaired, and is sometimes altogether absent. It is situated in the attached margin of the falx cerebelli. It commences near the foramen magnum, and ends by draining into the confluence of sinuses.

Occipital sinuses were discovered by Guichard Joseph Duverney.

Anatomy 
The occipital sinus is present in around 65% of individuals. It is usually single, but occasionally paired.

It is situated in the attached margin of the falx cerebelli.

Course 
The occipital sinus commences around the margin of the foramen magnum by several small venous channels (one of which joins the terminal part of the sigmoid sinus). It terminates by draining into the confluence of the sinuses.

Communications 
The occipital sinus communicates with the marginal sinus, and posterior internal vertebral venous plexuses.

Additional images

References 

Veins of the head and neck